Daniel Paul Haseltine (born January 12, 1973) is an American singer best known as lead vocalist for Christian alternative folk rock group Jars of Clay. Haseltine has performed vocals, piano, accordion, percussion and melodica, while with Jars of Clay. He has had different artistic titles, including songwriter, producer, film composer, music supervisor and art designer.

Haseltine is also the founder of the non-profit organization, Blood:Water Mission, where he currently sits as part of the board of directors. He is a regular writer and speaker about worship music, HIV/AIDS in Africa, social justice and church reform. Haseltine is also a regular columnist for Relevant Magazine, and has contributed articles to Moody, CCM Magazine, Christianity Today, World Vision, Campus Life and Beliefnet.

Biography
Haseltine attended Greenville College, where he was noticed by fellow student Charlie Lowell while wearing a Toad the Wet Sprocket T-shirt at a local concert. The two became friends and began Jars of Clay with guitarist Stephen Mason. Later they enlisted guitarist Matt Bronleewe, who was with the group for a short while but decided to complete his studies when the rest of the group left in 1995 before graduation. He was replaced by Matthew Odmark from Rochester, New York.

In 2001, Haseltine and the rest of Jars of Clay were awarded honorary graduations from Greenville College due to their demonstrated understanding of their craft. Haseltine has collaborated with other artists and authors in books such as "The Revolution: A Field Manual for Changing Your World" (2006) and "I.Am.Relevant: A Generation Impacting Their World With Faith" (2002).

In September 2007, Haseltine released his first children's book entitled, "The One, the Only Magnificent Me".  The book features artwork by illustrator Joel Schoon Tanis and will be published by Mackinac Island Press, Inc. The book was named a CMSpin bestseller on 2007-09-12. Haseltine was featured on the 2011 Plumb song "Drifting". The song peaked at No. 36 on the Billboard Hot Christian Songs chart.

In 2012, Haseltine released an EP called His + Hers along with Jeremy Bose and Matt Bronleewe as The Hawk in Paris. A full-length album was expected to be released in 2013.

In 2019, Haseltine and Matthew S. Nelson composed the soundtrack for The Chosen, including the theme song "Walk on the Water" (featuring Ruby Amanfu).

Personal life
He was formerly married to Katie Haseltine and is the father of two children, Noah and Max. They divorced in January 2022.

He attends an Anglican church in Nashville, Tennessee.

Solo discography

Compilation contributions

References

American rock singers
Living people
1975 births
Jars of Clay members
American performers of Christian music
Christian music songwriters
People from Hampden, Massachusetts
Grammy Award winners
21st-century American singers